Gonabad County is in Razavi Khorasan province, Iran. The capital of the county is the city of Gonabad. At the 2006 census, the county's population was 106,158, in 30,357 households. The following census in 2011 counted 80,783 people in 24,292 households, by which time Bajestan District had been separated from the county to form Bajestan County. At the 2016 census, Gonabad County's population was 88,753 in 27,607 households.

Climate and geography
Gonabad is located in a plate area on the north of the Brakoh mountain or Kūh-e Tīr Māhī

Administrative divisions

The population history and structural changes of Gonabad County's administrative divisions over three consecutive censuses are shown in the following table. The latest census shows two districts, four rural districts, and three cities.

Historical places 
 Bidokht
 Kakhk 
 Kūh-e Tīr Māhī
 Qanats of Gonabad 
 Zibad

See also
Davazdah Rokh
Zibad 
Iran
Gonabad
Kūh-e Tīr Māhī
Traditional water sources of Persian antiquity

References

Gallery

 

Counties of Razavi Khorasan Province